Gian Mark Fulgoni (Crickhowell, 24 January 1948) is a British businessman, entrepreneur and market research consultant.

His particular focus on the measurement of consumer behaviour and the effectiveness of advertising and promotion programs in TV, print and online. He has held several executive leadership positions, and has been a member of the executive team that managed the public offering of the research companies Information Resources, Inc. and Comscore, Inc. He has also served on the boards of public companies in the software, consumer electronics, pet products, marketing services and market research industries.

Career

Fulgoni began his career in 1970 with Management Science Associates, Inc. a market research company and by 1977 had been named Executive Vice-President with responsibility for the company's Chicago office and national consumer behaviour analysis business.

During the period from 1981 to 1998, Fulgoni held the positions of President, CEO and Chairman of Information Resources, Inc. (IRI), the global supplier of retail UPC scanner data to the CPG industry, where, under his leadership, the company's revenues grew at an annual rate of 40% to more than $500 million annually and its market value reached  $1.5 Billion. In 1996, IRI was recognised by Advertising Age magazine as the largest US market research firm. IRI used UPC scanner data for the analysis of consumer behaviour in the CPG industry through its BehaviorScan and Infoscan services.

From 1991 until 1999, he served as a member of the board of Platinum Technology, Inc., during which time the software services company grew from $80 million to more than $1 Billion in annual revenues. In 1999, Platinum Technology was acquired by Computer Associates in an all-cash transaction valued at $4 Billion—at the time the largest-ever acquisition in the software industry. Fulgoni also served on the board of US Robotics prior to its acquisition in 1997 by 3Com in a transaction valued at $8 Billion. In 1999 and 2000, Fulgoni served on the board of yesMail.com, a supplier of permission-based e-mail services. In March 2000, yesMail.com was acquired by CMGI for approximately $700 million.

Fulgoni co-founded Comscore in 1999, an Internet market intelligence company where he remained Executive chairman until 2014. In August 2016, Fulgoni was appointed CEO. The company provides marketing intelligence for companies in the CPG, Internet, media, retail, telecom, and other industries, and operates in 43 countries. He is the co-holder of a US patent governing Comscore's data collection technology. Comscore was selected as a "Technology Pioneer" by the World Economic Forum before the forum's annual conference in Davos in 2007. In 2010 Comscore was accepted by the World Economic Forum as a Global Growth Company Shaper, a program that recognises companies that are influencing global trends among growth technology companies.

Today, Fulgoni serves on the boards of PetMeds (NASDAQ:PETS), the largest pet pharmacy in the United States; InXpo, a supplier of technology for hosting virtual events; the Advertising Research Foundation (ARF); Prophet, a brand and marketing consultancy; Dynamic Signal, an internet social marketing services company; and the North American Foundation for the University of Manchester (NAFUM). Fulgoni is also a charter member of TiE Midwest, the world's largest not-for-profit organisation for entrepreneurs.

Fulgoni has authored articles in the Journal of Advertising Research, Admap and ESOMAR. He is a speaker at marketing industry conferences worldwide, discussing Internet industry trends and marketing.

Industry recognition
In 1991 and again in 2004, Fulgoni was named Illinois Entrepreneur of the Year, the only person to have twice received the award. In 1992, he received the Wall Street Transcript Award for outstanding contributions as CEO in enhancing the overall value of IRI to the benefit of its shareholders. In 2008, Fulgoni was inducted into the Chicago Entrepreneurship Hall of Fame. Also in 2008, Fulgoni was named Ernst & Young Entrepreneur of the Year.
He was awarded the Honorary Fellowship by the University of Glamorgan in Wales in 2012, which recognizes the efforts and achievements of individuals who have served a discipline area with particular distinction, in this case Fulgoni's career in the field of market research. In 2009 the Advertising Research Foundation awarded him its "Great Mind Award". and in 2014 the Advertising Research Foundation awarded him its Lifetime Achievement Award. In 2016 he was awarded a Doctor of Science by Lancaster University. In 2018 he was awarded the "Erwin Ephron De-Mystification Award" by the Advertising Research Foundation. In 2019, he was inducted into the Market Research Hall of Fame.

Personal life
Fulgoni was born and raised in Pontypool, South Wales, the son of Italian parents who had emigrated from Bardi, a small town in Emilia-Romagna. Fulgoni's father owned and operated a small restaurant. Fulgoni attended the University of Manchester from 1966 to 1969 where he graduated with an honours degree in Physics in 1969 before graduating with an M.A. in Marketing in 1970 from Lancaster University Management School in the second year of the university's masters in marketing program, at the time the only such program in the UK upon graduating, Fulgoni was offered an entry-level position by Management Science Associates as a project analyst, and moved to the US to work at the company's headquarters in Pittsburgh, Pennsylvania.

References 

1948 births
Living people
21st-century Welsh businesspeople
20th-century Welsh businesspeople
Alumni of Lancaster University
Alumni of the University of Manchester
People from Pontypool
Welsh people of Italian descent